Michael Rasmussen (born April 17, 1999) is a Canadian professional ice hockey centre for the Detroit Red Wings of the National Hockey League (NHL). Rasmussen was drafted ninth overall by the Red Wings in the 2017 NHL Entry Draft. He was born in Vancouver, British Columbia, but grew up in Surrey, British Columbia.

Playing career
Rasmussen was selected seventh overall by the Tri-City Americans in the 2014 WHL Bantam Draft. During the 2015–16 season in his rookie season, he recorded 18 goals and 25 assists in 63 games. During the 2016–17 season, he was limited to 50-of-72 games played due to injury. He recorded 32 goals and 23 assists, including a team-best 15 power-play goals, which tied for sixth most in the WHL.

Leading up to the NHL draft, Rasmussen was ranked the No. 5 North American skater by NHL Central Scouting. Craig Button of TSN described him as a solid player with size that can score at the net.

On June 23, 2017, Rasmussen was drafted ninth overall by the Detroit Red Wings in the 2017 NHL Entry Draft. On August 5, 2017, the Red Wings signed Rasmussen to a three-year, entry-level contract.

Rasmussen made his NHL debut for the Red Wings on October 4, 2018, during a 3–2 overtime loss to the Columbus Blue Jackets On October 8, Rasmussen recorded his first career NHL point, assisting on a goal by Tyler Bertuzzi during a 3–2 shootout loss to the Anaheim Ducks. On October 30, Rasmussen scored his first career NHL goal against Joonas Korpisalo of the Columbus Blue Jackets in a 5–3 win.

Due to the delayed start to the 2020–21 North American season, Rasmussen was loaned to the Graz99ers of the Austrian Hockey League. He made 18 appearances in the ICEHL with the 99ers, collecting 11 assists and 16 points, before returning to the Red Wings organization.

On July 22, 2021, Rasmussen signed a three-year, $4.38 million contract extension with the Red Wings.

Personal life
His parents are Denise and Paul and he has two older sisters, Jaclyn and Samantha.

International play
Rasmussen represented Canada Black at the 2015 World U-17 Hockey Challenge, where he recorded two goals and one assist in five games. Rasmussen represented Canada at the 2016 Ivan Hlinka Memorial Tournament, where he recorded one goal and three assists in four games.

Career statistics

Regular season and playoffs

International

References

External links

1999 births
Living people
Canadian ice hockey centres
Detroit Red Wings draft picks
Detroit Red Wings players
Grand Rapids Griffins players
Graz 99ers players
National Hockey League first-round draft picks
Penticton Vees players
Sportspeople from Surrey, British Columbia
Ice hockey people from Vancouver
Tri-City Americans players